The Thomas House is a historic home in Sarasota, Florida. It is located at 5030 Bay Shore Road. On July 1, 1994, it was added to the U.S. National Register of Historic Places.

References and external links

 Sarasota County listings at National Register of Historic Places
 Sarasota County listings at Florida's Office of Cultural and Historical Programs

Houses on the National Register of Historic Places in Sarasota County, Florida
Houses in Sarasota, Florida